Québec is a territory equivalent to a regional county municipality (TE) and census division (CD) of Quebec. Its geographical code is 23.

The TE of Québec consists of:

 the three municipalities of the urban agglomeration of Quebec City, namely
 the city of Quebec,
 the city of L'Ancienne-Lorette, and
 the city of Saint-Augustin-de-Desmaures;
 the parish municipality of Notre-Dame-des-Anges; and
 the Indian reserve of Wendake.

See also
 List of regional county municipalities and equivalent territories in Quebec

Census divisions of Quebec
Territories equivalent to a regional county municipality